Rambler or Ramble may refer to:

Places 
 Rambler, Wyoming
 Rambler Channel (藍巴勒海峽), separates Tsing Yi Island and the mainland New Territories in Hong Kong
 The Ramble and Lake, Central Park, an area within New York City's Central Park

Music 
 Rambler (Bill Frisell album), a 1985 album by guitarist Bill Frisell
 Rambler (Gábor Szabó album), a 1973 album by guitarist Gábor Szabó
 The Rambler (album), a 1977 album by Johnny Cash
 The Ramblers (band), long-running Dutch jazz ensemble
 The Ramblers, one-time backing band of Perry Como (notably on "Don't Let the Stars Get in Your Eyes")
 The Ramblers, a UK school choir who had a hit single with "The Sparrow" in 1979

Organizations 
 The Ramblers, a British charity for recreational walkers
 Loyola Ramblers, the varsity sports teams of Loyola University Chicago

People 
 RJD2 (born 1976), American producer, singer and musician whose full name is Ramble John "RJ" Krohn
 Charles Ramble (born 1957), anthropologist and university lecturer

Publications 
 The Rambler (1750–52), an essay series published by Edward Cave, mostly written by Samuel Johnson
 The Rambler (Catholic periodical) (1848–62), a Catholic magazine, founded by converts and edited by Cardinal Newman

Transport 
 Rambler (automobile) and Nash Rambler, American automobile brands made by Thomas B. Jeffery Company (1900–1914), Nash Motors (1950–1957), and AMC (1958–1969)
 Holiday Rambler, an American manufacturer of recreational vehicles
 HMS Rambler, four ships of the Royal Navy
 Rambler 100, a racing yacht that capsized in the Fastnet Race on 15 August 2011
 Rambler (yacht), a 2002 yacht
 Rambler (bicycle), a turn-of-the-century American bicycle

Others 
 Rambler (portal), a Russian search engine and Web portal similar to Yahoo!
 The Rambler (film), a 2013 American horror film
 Rambler Rose, a species of rose native to eastern Asia, in China, Japan, and Korea
 Rambling, walking in the United Kingdom
 Ranch-style house or rambler